Ghosi is an Assembly constituency of the Uttar Pradesh Legislative Assembly covering the city of Ghosi in the Mau district of Uttar Pradesh, India.
 
Ghosi is one of five assembly segments under the Ghosi Lok Sabha constituency. Since 2008, this assembly constituency is numbered 354 amongst 403 constituencies.

The MLA was Vijay Rajbhar who won a by-poll in 2019.

Members of Vidhan Sabha

Election results

2022

2019 Bypoll

17th Vidhan Sabha: 2017 General Elections

References

External links
 

Assembly constituencies of Uttar Pradesh
Mau district